José Augusto Martins Fernandes Pedreira (10 April 1935 – 14 October 2020) was a Portuguese Roman Catholic bishop.

Martins Fernandes Pedreira was born in Portugal and was ordained to the priesthood in 1959. He served as titular bishop of Elvas and as auxiliary bishop of the Roman Catholic Diocese of Porto, Portugal from 1982 to 1997 and as bishop of the Roman Catholic Diocese of Viana do Castelo, Portugal from 1997 to 2010.

Notes

1935 births
2020 deaths
21st-century Roman Catholic bishops in Portugal
20th-century Roman Catholic bishops in Portugal